Izabela Dorota Leszczyna (born September 3, 1962 in Częstochowa) is a Polish politician, teacher, local official, Member of the Polish Parliament (since 2007).

Biography 

Leszczyna graduated on Polish philology at the Jagiellonian University in Kraków. In 2006 she was elected to Częstochowa City Council from the Civic Platform. Leszczyna was elected from the Civic Platform to the Sejm in: 2007, 2011, 2015 and 2019.

In 2010, in the elections for the office of President of Częstochowa, she obtained the second result (21.99%). In the second round of elections, she obtained 29.11% of votes and was defeated by Krzysztof Matyjaszczyk.

References

External links 

 Izabela Leszczyna - parliamentary page - includes declarations of interest, voting record, and transcripts of speeches.

Women members of the Sejm of the Republic of Poland
Civic Platform politicians
1962 births
Living people
21st-century Polish women politicians
Members of the Polish Sejm 2007–2011
Members of the Polish Sejm 2011–2015
Members of the Polish Sejm 2015–2019
Members of the Polish Sejm 2019–2023